Julien Lanoo (born 1985) is a Belgian photographer. He documents the built environment and his works are best known for his "humanistic" approach, where people and broader architectural contexts are at the centre of attention. In 2016, his images are nominated as the world's best professional photographs of buildings and structures of the year by Arcaid Images.
In 2021, Studio Julien Lanoo is named the 'World's Best Architecture Photography Studio’ at the 
Architizer A+Awards.

Published books

Built, Unbuilt, 2017, 

3F présente, 25 quartiers renouvelés, 2015, 

Vitra Campus: Architecture Design Industry, 2014, 

Traces: LAN (Local Architecture Network), 2014,

References

External links
 Official website
 World-Architects – Julien Lanoo: Selected Works
 Julien Lanoo on Archdaily

1985 births
Belgian photographers
Living people